Hare Krishna Konar (5 August 1915 – 23 July 1974) was an Indian Marxist revolutionary, radical activist and Communist politician. Konar was a founding member of Communist Party of India (Marxist), and the leader to start the first land reforms and agrarian reforms in India as well as the chief architect of the West Bengal land and property distribution. In the 1930s for making arms and bombs for the Jugantar group, he was deported to the Cellular Jail for 6 years at the age of 18 and there he took part in the first hunger strike and in 1935 he founded the Communist Consolidation and led the historical second hunger strike. Konar was the mentor of freedom fighters like Batukeshwar Dutt, Shiv Verma, Sachindra Nath Sanyal, Ganesh Ghosh, etc.

Early life (1915–1938)

Early life and education (1915–32)
Hare Krishna Konar was born to an upper middle class family and was the eldest son of Sarat Chandra Konar and Satyabala Devi. His father was a businessman as well as a landlord of Kamargoria village. He was born on 5 August 1915 in Kamargoria village, under Raina Police Station in Bardhaman District of Bengal in British India. Up to class 4 he used to study in Kamargoria Prathmik Bidyalay. At young age, he shifted to South Radhakantopur village of Memari with his father, mother and started education there. In 1930 while studying at Memari Vidyasagar Smriti Vidyamandir in class 9, while the Satyagraha movement was going on around the country Hare Krishna Konar along with his father Sarat Chandra Konar met with Burdwan Congress leader Benoy Choudhury who was the leading figure of Burdwan Congress committee. That day comrade Konar revealed to his father that he also wanted to join the Burdwan Congress party as well as the Indian independence movement, but his father disagreed with joining the party and Benoy Choudhury also didn't allow him to join and returned by that day but soon, he broke his father's chest to collect money for the  cause of revolutionary struggle. The love for the motherland was so deep-rooted that without asking his family members he joined the Indian independence movement and he boycotted the school to participate in the Indian Civil disobedience movement at the age of 15 and was arrested on 6 April 1930 because of Mahatma Gandhi's abolishing of Salt March act. That time he was imprisoned for 6 months, in the jail he again met with Benoy Choudhury and Saroj Mukherjee who was convicted of Anushilan Samiti's bomb case activity then Choudhury suggested Konar join the revolutionary movement rather than support the Nonviolence movement. After releasing from jail in October 1930, he started to propagate that using the ideology of Ahimsa and Gandhism their country can never ever get Purna Swaraj,  having to acquire arms and bombs to directly fight against British Empire. That time his father Sarat Chandra Konar was tensioned about Hare Krishna Konar's revolutionary activities against the British Raj, so his father took him to Kolkata to keep him away from the revolutionary activities and movements of Indian Independence. In 1931 his father admitted him in Bangabasi college under University of Calcutta but comrade Konar's love towards motherland India was so deep that he couldn't concentrate in his study and he joined the Jugantar revolutionary party just after few months of joining college and made an underground political group in Kolkata. This was the part of Calcutta's Jugantar group, this group were made to produce and manufacture arms and bombs to supply these arms to the Jugantar revolutionaries of Anushilan samiti. After 1 year of underground revolutionary activities, finally on 15 September 1932 at the age of 18 while studying B.A. on Economics at Bangabasi College, under the University of Calcutta he was captured and arrested by Britishers and British officers.

Revolutionary activities (1932–38)
On 15 September 1932 British officers took him to Burdwan Jail and the next day they transported Konar to Calcutta High Court and in his court trial Konar was present along with other revolutionaries from all parts of Bengal like Mohan Kishore Namadas and Sitangshu Dutta Roy (arrested for netrakona arms conspiracy case), Karthik Chandra Dey Das and Mukul Chandra roy (arrested for calcutta arms act case), Gourishankar Dubey (arrested for muzaffarpur political dacoity case), Bindubhushan Sen (arrested for jamalpur dacoity and arms conspiracy case), Jagadananda Mukherjee (cornwallis street shooting case) and when British Judges ask Comrade Hare Krishna Konar that did he is Shameful for his revolutionary activities against the British Empire or not then comrade Hare Krishna Konar said in his court trial that: 

After his addressing in Calcutta High Court, the court as well as the british judges sentenced him for lifetime imprisonment in Cellular Jail (Kālā Pānī) and ordered to gave him the highest  punishment of Kālā Pānī on Cellular Jail in Andaman Islands, through comrade konar was imprisoned for forming a political and freedom dacoity in 1932-33 and to produce bombs and arms for Jugantar group the part of anushilan samiti of calcutta (present day Kolkata) this jugantar group was formed towards to uproot British Raj in India.

Before being arrested on 15 September 1932, he was already in contact with communist leaders like Abdul Halim, Muzaffar Ahmad, Bankim Mukherjee, Bhupendranath Dutta. Soon after imprisonment in andaman jail comrade konar faced the inhuman and unimaginable tortures, treatment of Kālā Pānī was physical tortures as well as the food that was given was not fit for human consumption, there were worms when they opened the bread and wild grass was boiled and served in rotten vegetables, rain water was given for drinking and the water was full of insects and worms, 13×6 cells were dark and damp and dingy thickly coated with moss, there were no toilets, there were no lights, no reading material, prisoners were not allowed to meet with each other, the guards carried out physical torture and flogging, their behaviour was insulting, things had become unbearable, so the prisoners came in a conclusion to do hunger strike against the jail authorities to improve the systems in jail, soon on 12 May 1933 the hunger strike was fast undo death, Mahavir Singh (arrested for convicted in Lahore Conspiracy Case and associated with Bhagat Singh), Mohan Kishore Namadas (arrested for Calcutta arms act case) and Mohit Moitra (arrested for convicted in Arms Act Case) died for Force-feeding by British warders during this hunger strike, their bodies were quietly ferreted away and thrown out to sea, so that the Indians could not get an issue to revolt against the British governments. Central Jail Lahore's inspector David Barker was called to break the hunger strike, he issued orders to stop the strike of drinking water. The freedom fighters were resolute, there was a huge outcry throughout India because of this hunger strike. After 46 days of this hunger strike, the British Raj had to bow and request to stop the hunger strike and they said the facilities they are demanding for will be accepted, so revolutionary of Cellular Jail had accept it, thus the hunger strike ended on 26 June 1933, and soon after the death of three respect revolutionaries Mahavir Singh, Mohan Kishore Namadas and Mohit Moitra in the hunger strike, the facilities won from cellular jail authorities improved, which prisoners will be noted as less dangerous he will be released but will under the eyes of Britishers, light was fixed in every cell, opportunity to play sports, cultural events was organised by the jail authority and jail work was reduced to minimal, prisoners were allowed and given:

• Soap to bath

• Bed to sleep

• Edible food

• Allowed to study

• Given respect by the jail authority to the prisoners

• Allowed to communicate amongst themselves and many other facilities were also grewed.

During the hunger strike comrade konar met with Satish Pakrashi (connection with Dakhineswar Bomb case), Subodh Roy (Chittagong armoury raid), Niranjan Sengupta (Mechua Bazar Bomb case), Ganesh Ghosh (Chittagong armoury raid), Batukeshwar Dutt (Central Legislative Assembly bomb case), Sachindra Nath Sanyal (Rash Behari Bose and founded Manifesto of H.R.A.) Jibendra Das (Anushilan revolutionary), Nalini Das (Mechua Bazar Bomb case), Shiv Verma (Bhagat Singh and lahore conspiracy case), met many others and soon after the hunger strike the supervision and checking process in the jail was extremely reduced, so the prisoners had been able to smuggle in a lot amount of communist and socialist literature. Narain Roy, Niranjan Sengupta and Central Jail Lahore Group smuggled the largest volume of literature in the cellular jail. Several prisoners were of high learning and had been permitted all sorts of books for study in jail, on their release the prisoners made over their literature to the other revolutionary, who brought them to the Andaman unchecked by the so many authorities which formally checked them, on their way to the Andaman. The prisoners also requested the warders outside the andaman jail to get books direct from the book smugglers, the prisoners requested their relatives though letter to send them particular books, when they arrived in jail, they were checked by the authorities who finding them objectionable set them aside. However, some revolutionary prisoners who were working in the jail office who picked those books and gave them to their comrades. The cellular jail authority made a library for the revolutionaries but the control of the library passed into the hands of all the left radical who were formerly a revolutionary and named the library as "The Veritable University of Revolutionaries", this was about the year 1935. The prisoners spent most of their time in reading communist or socialist literature in "The Veritable University " and a thirst for books and knowledge began, there were students, doctors, lawyers, peasants, and workers all together, discussion of politics, economics, history and philosophy as the result that there was hardly any left who had not become a confirmed Communist or Socialist. Hare krishna konar, Shiv verma, Satish pakrasi held study circles, in which the principles of Socialism, Marxism and Communism were explained, biology and physiology given by the doctors amongst them, others gave the classes of historical and dialectical materialism eventually a different and new environment was created as the revolutionary met to discuss and read. Soon Hare Krishna Konar and Shiv verma decided to make an organ of the party which was called the Communist Consolidation, should be started immediately with 39 prisoners on 26 April 1935 the Consolidation was formed. “Vande Mataram” and “Bharat Mata ki Jai” and other national slogans were never used. The consolidation members only use the slogan of "Inquilab Zindabad" and "Dunia ka majduro ek ho". Dhanwantri, Bejoy Kumar Sinha, Batukeshwar Dutt, Narain Roy, and Niranjan Sengupta were appointed to the editorial board of a Newspaper, named “The Call”, which were published from the jail. The “Call” was started as a monthly paper and act as a mouthpiece of communist consolidation, the number of member in communist consolidation swelled to 200 and all of them contributed articles on different subjects dealing with Communism, Marxism, Socialism, Biography of Vladimir Lenin, Karl Marx, etc., “The Call” was like a magazine paper, only one copy was written and placed in the library, it had about 150 pages, later the consolidation member celebrates the May Day, October Revolution Day, Vladimir Lenin's birthday, etc. These activities of the Communist Consolidation continued unhindered till about the middle of 1937. The Chittagong arms Group members therefore, started military parades, at first without the sanction of the authorities, but a little later with the full approval of the authorities. They also had their uniform prepared, they prepared their buttons and badges from the silver utensils they were given for use. Ananta Singh was their leader instructor, they were able to put up a very impressive show. When they marched past, and performed several lying and attacking formations with their Bamboo sticks used instead of muskets, they appeared really magnificent. The members of the Communist Consolidation were so impressed with these military drills of the Chittagong group that they also sought permission from the Communist Consolidation leaders to join the daily parades of the Chittagong Group. This resulted in the number of the Chittagong paraders increasing to about 90 and all the chittagong arms group member also join the Communist consolidation. This is the time of 1937 the prisoners were enjoying their daily activities and saying themselves as political prisoners of Andaman Cellular Jail.

In the time 1937 the revolutionaries of cellular jail started feeling the atmosphere for the world war and the freedom fighters thought that before the war starts we should get back to our country to be with our people and take active part in the Anti-war movement and as after studying about Marxism, Communism and Socialism the freedom fighters of jail started saying themselves as political prisoners so they want to get treated like other political prisoners who were treated in other jails for that's why a petition was sent to Viceroy and governor-general The Marquess of Linlithgow on 9 July 1937 by Shiv Verma and Hare Krishna Konar that: 

But there was no response from the viceroy The Marquess of Linlithgow, so finally on 25 July 1937 the 385 political prisoners went on hunger strike, some of the 80 other prisoners got bailed by giving the excuse to the jail authority that they are going on their personal works and businesses, but actually they were going to propagate and to encourage the Indians to do protest against the British government to transfer the prisoners from andaman to mainland and creating a noise and protesting against the force feeding by the jailers. The prisoners also arrange to get information regarding Indian reactions to the hunger strike, it had already been arranged that the newspapers containing Indian reactions should be smuggled inside the jail through some warders and other contacts which had been established with some of the local peoples. A country wide movement on the mainland in support of demands of the Andaman freedom fighters began to treated as other political prisoners like other jails. There was a mass demonstration of working people, intellectuals and students. This upsurge clearly showed that their people on the mainland did not forget them. After four weeks telegrams from leaders of the nation Jawaharlal Nehru, Subhas Chandra Bose, Sarat Chandra Bose, Rabindranath Tagore, etc. poured in imploring the freedom fighters to end their hunger strike. Letter to Viceroy on 3 August 1937 by Rabindranath Tagore that:

Letter to Hare Krishna Konar on 28 August 1937 by Mahatma Gandhi and the Congress Working Committee that:
 After a lot of deliberation and discussion this historic 36-days hunger strike of 200 revolutionary freedom fighters ended. The process of repatriation started in September 1937. There were a total of 385 freedom fighters in jail at the time. 339 from Bengal, 19 from Bihar, 11 from Uttar Pradesh, 5 from Assam, 3 from Punjab, 2 from Delhi and 2 from Madras and most of the member of this organization along with Hare Krishna Konar was previously the member of Anushilan Samiti and Jugantar or from Pro Marxist groups and Hare Krishna Konar was released in 1938.

After being released from jail in 1938 he met with M. N. Roy (Founder of CPI), Muzaffar Ahmed (Prominent member of CPI from Bengal), Abdul Halim (Member of CPI from Bengal), Bankim Mukherjee and Bhupendranath Datta, whom konar has previously met before arresting in 1932 and after releasing he again met with them and earned the membership of the Communist Party of India (CPI) and from that year Hare Krishna Konar's Communist movement and path through the Anti-capitalism and Anti-imperialism starts. So, legally comrade konar earned the Communist Party of India's membership in 1938 but he was involved or get influence with the ideology of Communism and Marxism-Leninsim since the middle of the 1930s.

In Communist movement (1938–1974)
He first worked among the workers in Calcutta and Howrah. After some months Comrade Benoy Chowdhury took him to Bardhaman district and he started working in the kisan (farmers) movement. In 1939, he participated in the Canal Tax protest in Bardhaman district. In 1940 he was banned by the British Government from entering Asansol, Burnpur area and later on from Bardhaman district. But he still worked from underground in Bardhaman, and he was once arrested for few months.

In 1944 he was again arrested and he was banned by the government to step out of Bardhaman City. He played important role during the Ajay river Dam movement of 1943–1944 and second stage of Canal Tax protest of 1946–1947. While canvassing for elections in colliery area of Asansol he was physically assaulted by goons, and his legs were broken.  In March 1948 when the CPI was banned, he was arrested immediately for 3 months. After being released he went into hiding and remained so until 1952. His chief role was maintaining communications between Kolkata, Bardhaman, Howrah and Hooghly in this time. He played an important role during the Food Movement of West Bengal in 1953, and Civil Disobedience movement in 1957, and was arrested both times. Sino-Indian war fighting began on the Himalayan border on 10 October 1962 between the Chinese People's Liberation Army and Army of India. This issue that fueled the split in the Communist Party of India was parting of the ways between the USSR and China. Though the conflict had a long history, it came out in open in 1959, Nikita Khrushchev sought to appease the West during a period of the Cold War known as 'The Thaw', by holding a summit meeting with U.S. President Dwight D. Eisenhower. Two other reasons were USSR's unwillingness to support Chinese nuclear program and their neutrality in the initial days of Sino-Indian border conflict. These events greatly offended Mao Zedong and the other Chinese Communist leaders. In 1962, Mao Zedong criticised Nikita Khrushchev for backing down in the Cuban Missile Crisis. By that time the Soviets were openly supporting India in its border dispute with China. These events were followed by formal statements of each side's ideological positions: the Chinese came out with their document in June 1963. The Soviets too came out with their own document. Thereafter the two parties stopped communicating. During the 1962 Sino-Indian war, other parties portrayed left-wing parties as pro-China, since both were Communist. Hare Krishna Konar among with other Communists stated that the left Wings was focused on solving the border dispute through talk. As of 1963 the All India Kisan Sabha had been rendered dysfunctional as most of its key leaders and cadres had been jailed. However, by late 1963 and early 1964 most of jailed AIKS leaders and cadres were released from prison. During the 1964 split in CPI, there were efforts to retain AIKS as a united organization. However, there were tensions between the CPI(M) and CPI factions within AIKS, per Surjeet (1995) a mayor source of tension was the rejection of the rightists to demand release of jailed AIKS leaders. Among the AIKS grassroots, the majority sided with CPI(M). But the split in the AIKS top leadership was 'somewhat uneven' per Sharma (1978). Its president, Gopalan, went to CPI(M) whilst the general secretary Bhowani Sen sided with CPI(Right). Among key Central Kisan Council members, the ones that sided with CPI(M) included Lyallpuri, Parulekar, Konar, C.H. Kanaran and N. Prasad Rao. In the CPI(Right) faction, in the Central Kisan Council key leaders included Manali C. Kandaswami, B.V. Kakkilaya, Jagannath Sarkar, Z.A. Ahmed and Karyanand Sharma and on 11 April 1964, the landmark incident happened in Delhi, the "Leftist faction" happned in Communist Party of India national council including 30 Leftists P. Sundarayya, M. Basavapunniah, T. Nagi Reddy, M. Hanumantha Rao, D.V. Rao, N. Prasad Rao, G. Bapanayya, A.K. Gopalan, A.V. Kunhambu, C.H. Kanaran, E.K. Nayanar, V.S. Achuthanandan, E.K. Imbichibava, Promode Dasgupta, Muzaffar Ahmed, Abdul Halim, Hare Krishna Konar, Saroj Mukherjee, P. Ramamurthi, M.R. Venkataraman, N. Sankariah, K. Ramani, Harkishan Singh Surjeet, Jagjit Singh Lyallpuri, D.S. Tapiala, Bhag Singh, Sheo Kumar Mishra, R.N. Upadhyaya, Mohan Punamiya, and R.P. Saraf and two Centrist leaders, E. M. S. Namboodiripad and Jyoti Basu, walked out from the meeting to protest against the “revisionist policies” of General Secretary Shripad Amrit Dange and his followers, particularly the failure to have “class struggle” as its main policy. Shripad Amrit Dange's followers had an overwhelming majority in the National Council and The left fraction section organised their own conference in Tenali, Andhra Pradesh. These thirty-two leaders were also suspended from National Council of Communist Party of India on that day 11 April 1964. The left leaders who were ousted, in turn, announced a separated national convention. while the leftist fraction group holds a parallel congress in  Tenali, Andhra Pradesh and The leftist section, to which the 32 National Council members belonged, organized a convention in Tenali, Andhra Pradesh 7 to 11 July. In this convention, the issues of the internal disputes in the party were discussed. 146 delegates, claiming to represent 100,000 CPI members, at the Tenali convention a Bengal-based pro-Chinese group like konar, mukherjee, Dasgupta, basu and halim, representing one of the most radical streams of the CPI left-wing and in that meeting they decided to make the party in 7th Congress of Communist Party of India. The Congress government of P C Sen in Bengal arrested many of the breakaway group's leaders days before the Congress, and in 1964 Hare Krishna Konar was imprisoned for two years, for that's why he could not take part in 7th Congress of Communist Party of India's parallel where the Communist Party of India (Marxist) were formed in calcutta, for that reason he could not able to be the member of 1st Politburo but he was elected as central committee and after some months many other communist leader was also arested for joining the seventh Congress in calcutta, such as the former chief minister of Kerala, E. M. S. Namboodiripad, the organisational specialist Promode Dasgupta, the former Chief Minister of West Bengal, Jyoti Basu, the Telangana revolutionaries, Puchalapalli Sundarayya and Makineni Basavapunnaiah as well as some members of the rightist section such as the trade unionist A. B. Bardhan and was released after an order from the Supreme Court of India in 1966. By 1967 AIKS was divided into two parallel organizations, as a consequence of the split in the party. At the August 28, 1967 Central Kisan Council meeting in Madurai, differences arose over the membership figures. The CPI(M) faction in AIKS accused the CPI faction of presenting false inflated membership data of state units in order to increase their influence in the organization. The dispute led to a walk-out from the Central Kisan Council. In 1968 Hare Krishna Konar was elected as the first general secretary of the new fraction from rightist organization to leftist.

He was one of the co-founders of Communist Party of India (Marxist) when it was formed from Communist Party of India in 1964. From 1957 he was a member of the West Bengal State Council of CPI. From 1964 until his death he was a member of West Bengal State Committee of CPI(M). From 1958 he was a member of National Council of CPI and from 1964 until his death he was a member of Central Committee of CPI(M). From 1954 until his death he was the Secretary of West Bengal Provincial Kisan Sabha (part of All India Kisan Sabha) and Member of central council of All India Kisan Sabha CPI. From 1968 until his death he was the General Secretary of All India Kisan Sabha CPI(M). He was also the Member of Chinese Communist Party, Communist Party of Vietnam, Communist Party of the Soviet Union and the Member of Trade Unions International of World Federation.

In West Bengal government

1957–1962In the West Bengal Legislative Assembly election of 1957, Hare Krishna Konar and Jamadar Majhi was elected as the representative of the Kalna constituency and the Communist Party returned as the second largest party with an increased representation. This platform enabled the Communist Party under the leadership of Jyoti Basu in West Bengal to exacerbate agitations against the prevalent food crisis in West Bengal by acting as the principal opposition on the floor of the assembly, increasing public awareness and providing a united front for agitators to rally around.

1962–1967In the West Bengal Legislative Assembly election of 1962, Hare Krishna Konar was once again re-elected as the representative of the Kalna constituency. In the following period the Communist Party underwent a vertical split with a section of the party including Hare Krishna Konar going on to form the Communist Party of India (Marxist). There were several ongoing ideological conflicts between sections within the Communist Party with regards to the nature of the Indian State and the characterisation and method of interaction with the Indian National Congress, with regards to the approach towards the ongoing debate between the Soviet Union and China and with regards to the handling of the border disputes between India and China. These debates were further exacerbated by the food movement in West Bengal and brought to the forefront by the rising border tensions between India and China. The Communist Party had also become the second largest party in the Lok Sabha following the 1962 Indian general election with nearly 10% vote share which is described to have brought prominence to the internal divisions of the party.

1967–1969In the West Bengal Legislative Assembly election of 1967, fourteen opposition parties contested through two pre-poll political alliances; Communist Party of India (Marxist) led United Left Front and the Communist Party of India and Bangla Congress (splinter of the Congress party formed in 1966) led People's United Left Front. The Communist Party of India (Marxist) became the second largest party outstripping its former party, the Communist Party of India. Following the election, the two alliances joined forces to form the United Front government in West Bengal. During the negotiations between the two alliances, Jyoti Basu was denied the position of chief minister due to opposition to the idea from the Communist Party of India and Bangla Congress, all of whom eventually settled for Ajoy Mukherjee of the Bangla Congress as the consensus candidate for the position while Jyoti Basu became the deputy chief minister and in-charge of the finance department and Hare Krishna Konar as the Minister of Land and Land Revenue. The government however collapsed within a year when the food minister, P. C. Ghosh resigned from the government after facing persistent agitations led by the Communist Party of India (Marxist) (both part of the same government) against his policy of seeking voluntary measures from landlords and middlemen which were ineffective in resolving the food crisis.

1969–1971For the mid term West Bengal Legislative Assembly election of 1969, the United Front Committee was formed consisting of all the coalition partners of the previous government which agreed upon a pre-poll alliance to contest the election together under a 32-point programme. Under terms of the agreement, if the alliance were to attain a majority then Ajoy Mukherjee would become the chief minister while Jyoti Basu would become the deputy chief minister. In addition during the negotiations Basu was able to secure the portfolios of fisheries, food, excise, labour, civil defence and education for the CPI-M as well as Minister of Land and Land Revenue was changed his name to Minister of Land and Land Reforms and the minister was Hare Krishna Konar. In the election, the United Front won an overwhelming victory with 214 out of 280 seats and as a consequence the Communist Party of India (Marxist) stood as the first party other than the Congress party to become the largest party in the assembly.

The second United Front government however too fell within a short period of time, on this occasion the chief minister Ajoy Mukherjee resigned in March 1970 after facing an aggravated and dysfunctional government where smaller member parties were in confrontation with the Communist Party of India (Marxist), the largest among them on various issues. The government continued to be operational until the dissolution of the assembly by presidential proclamation on 30 July.

1971–1972In the following West Bengal Legislative Assembly election of 1971, the parties contested alone but Communist Party of India (Marxist) remained as the single largest party while increasing its number of seats from 80 to 113. Both the former chief minister Ajoy Mukherjee of the Bangla Congress and the former Minister of Land and Land Revenue of the Communist Party of India (Marxist) contested from the Kalna constituency which ended with Hare Krishna Konar  and Jyoti Basu winning.

1972–1972In the West Bengal Legislative Assembly election of 1972, Congress won an overwhelming majority and Siddhartha Shankar Ray who was previously in the Bangla Congress and later appointed as a specialised union cabinet ministry called West Bengal Affairs Minister became the new chief minister of the state. The Communist Party of India (Marxist) was only able to secure 14 seats and Hare Krishna Konar for the first time lost his seat in the Kalna constituency to his former associate Nurul Islam Molla. Before the election, the Communist Party of India allied with Congress while a section of the Bangla Congress had also merged with the Congress. The opposing alliance was led by the Communist Party of India (Marxist) which included the previous members of the United Left Front alongside the Biplobi Bangla Congress, a splinter of the Bangla Congress.

World Communist movement
He knew 16 international languages like Chinese, German, Korean, Russian, Ukrainian, Spanish, Vietnamese, etc. He was the member of Chinese Communist Party, Communist Party of the Soviet Union, Communist Party of Vietnam, World Federation of Trade Unions International and as a representative of the Communist Party of India, The Workers Party of Vietnam held its third national party congress in Hanoi from 5–12 September 1960 and to meet with Ho Chi Minh the founder of Workers Party of Vietnam. From Communist Party of India the representative were K. Damodaran and Hare Krishna Konar Allegedly, Ajoy Ghosh the general secretary of Communist Party of India had instructed the two delegates to stay away from contact with the Chinese delegation at Hanoi. In Vietnam Hare Krishna Konar and K. Damodaran met with Ho Chi Minh and discussed the serious matter about the ideological dispute between China and USSR, In Hanoi Congress Damodaran refused to meet with Chinese delegation, but Hare Krishna Konar met with them and accepted their invitation to visit Peking (present day Beijing), immediately after the Hanoi congress. In Peking (present day Beijing) Hare Krishna Konar met with Mao Zedong, Zhou Enlai, Liu Shaoqi, Lin Biao and other leaders and immediately an emergency conference had held in Peking (present day Beijing), China in 1960 for Indian Communist leader Hare Krishna Konar, the meeting between Mao Zedong and Hare Krishna Konar is the landmark meeting in Indian Communist history as well as Chinese Communist history, in that meeting Mao Zedong said to Hare Krishna Konar that if the Communist Party of India will led in whole India rather than Indian National Congress then only we will release all the captured land from India and also stopped the Sino-Indian War for boder dispute, Upon Hare Krishna Konar's return to India he argued for Chinese Communist Party positions on border issue as well as the wider ideological conflict between Communist Party of Soviet Union and Chinese Communist Party. This was first direct attempt by Chinese Communist Party to gain influence inside the Communist Party of India. He also attended the Trade Union International of Agricultural, Forestry and Plantation Worker's conference at Prague, Czechoslovakia in 1970; He attended the Communist Party of Cuba's conference at Havana, Cuba in 1970 and met with Fidel Castro; He attended the Progressive Party of Working People's conference in Nicosia, Cyprus in 1970; He has also attended the Communist Party of the Soviet Union's conference and met with communist leader Leonid Brezhnev at Moscow Kremlin, Soviet Union (Present day Russia) in 1971; He attended the Romanian Communist Party's conference and met with Nicolae Ceaușescu at Bucharest, Romania in the 1960s; He had also attended Worker's Party of Korea's conference at Pyongyang, North Korea in 1971 and there he has given lecture in front of Choe Yong-gon the Head of State of North Korea and met with Kim Il-sung; He attended Italian Communist Party's conference at Rome, Italy in 1971; He attended the Mexican Communist Party's conference at Mexico City, Mexico in 1973 and Socialist Unity Party of Germany's conference at Berlin, Germany in 1973.

Naxalbari uprising
Naxalite movement derives its name from Naxalbari, a small place in Siliguri subdivision of Darjeeling district of West Bengal. It all started in 1967 after the first non-congress government came into power under the name of United Front Government. The dominant forces in the government were the Leftists. The main forces were the CPI and the CPI(M). They represented the aspirations of the marginalized and the poor. The minister-in-charge of Land and Land Revenue was Hare Krishna Konar who was a veteran peasant leader. In an interview with his party mouthpiece Ganashakti, he made his intentions clear about the quick distribution of surplus land and he further asked for peasant initiative and organized force. What he did not realize was that the aspirations of the poor peasantry were already on a high note and his invitation escalated them further. As the later developments showed they went far beyond his expectations. Although there were no doubts about the intentions of the leftists in the government about the redistribution, the path to achieve the goals was not that simple. There were some constraints before government. To name a few first they were not sure about how to recover the land from the landlords. Second the landlords could take the help of law to delay the seizure of land and thus postpone the redistribution for an indefinite period. Third was the working of the bureaucracy. There were some instances of even defying the orders of the ministers. As a result of these obstacles, the government could not implement the land reforms quickly. The CPI(M) was in a difficult situation because it was in the power so it could not totally do away the legal and official procedure and on the other hand the aspirations of the peasantry had to be satisfied. Everyone was not happy with government policy of redistributing the land through legal process. One of such prominent figures was Charu Mazumdar who was attacking Hare Krishna Konar on three accounts. The first point was that he submitted to the bureaucrats and feudal gentry. The second point was that there might be disputes among the peasants who acquired the land through legal process and those who got it through forceful means. The third point was that the peasants who would acquire the land through legal process might eventually become a complacent middle farmer. Developments at Naxalbari: In this light a peasants’ conference was held under the auspices of CPI(M) at Naxalbari and it gave a call for ending the monopoly ownership of land by landlords, organization and arming of peasants to destroy the resistance of landlords. Among the sponsors of the conference were Kanu Sanyal and Jangal Santhal who later became prominent leaders of the Naxalbari movement. Both of them were in favor of political propaganda and mass mobilization what was opposed by Charu Mazumdar. He wanted only action. So there were some differences on the part of the strategy to be followed but they were clear on many points such as that India's liberation could be achieved only through China's path, propagation of politics of agrarian struggle among the working class and the peasantry and building up a secret party to prepare cadres for this purpose. As a result of those differences pointed out already, Siliguri Local committee cadres decided to go on the path of mass movements whereas West Dinajpur unit decided to stick to the idea of Charu babu. Now the mobilization started on a large scale. From March to April (1967) all the villages of the Naxalbari were organized and 15000 to 20000 peasants were enrolled as whole time activists. They soon occupied the land in the name of peasants’ committees, burnt all land records, cancelled all hypothetical debts, and passed death sentences on oppressive landlords. They also formed armed bands by looting guns from the landlords, armed themselves with conventional weapons and set up a parallel administration to look after the villages. By May of that year itself three or four places were totally under the control of rebels. In the meantime Charu babu addressed a meeting of the cadres and asked them to always be on the side of the poor and landless peasant. He said that our relation with rich farmers would always be of struggling nature. Observing that the situation going out of control UF government woke up and Hare Krishna Konar was sent to the Naxalbari region and he asked the rebels to put down their arms and file the petition for the distribution of land vested with the government. It was also agreed that all the persons wanted by Police would also surrender. But the agreement was never implemented. Just after the return of minister from that place, a Police camp was established there. In the wake of these developments the first serious clash between Police and the peasants occurred on 23 May 1967, when a policeman was killed and in retaliation police opened fire on a crowd of villagers and killed nine people. Out of them six were women and two were children. This incident created tensions within and outside the United Front government. The West Bengal Secretariat condemned the incident and accused Chief Minister Ajoy Mukherjee, an ex-Congressman of laying ‘one sided stress on police measures to maintain law and order’. Meanwhile, news of clashes between peasants and landlords kept pouring in from Naxalbari and between third and 10 June. There were as many as eighty incidents of dacoity, two murders and also one abduction. Mr. B. Chavan Union Home Minister told the Lok Sabha that a reign of terror has been created in Darjeeling. By the end of June while the leadership of Communist Party of India (Marxist) was openly against the Naxalbari rebels. In Calcutta several groups within and outside CPI(M) were coming together. These groups formed the Naxalbari Peasants Struggle Aid Committee, which became a nucleus of separate party of the future. CPI(M) expelled 19 members in the light of the formation of the committee. In the meantime some other important developments were also taking place. On 28 June Radio Peking supported the movement and dubbed the United Front government as a ‘tool of Indian reactionaries to deceive the people’. This was the first incident of Chinese support to rebels and of Peking's disenchantment with CPI(M). On 12 July a major police action was launched. Although Chief Minister claimed that it was cabinet's decision, but CPI(M) tried to dissociate itself from the police action. The Chief Minister also came under attack. By 20 July the prominent leaders like Jangal Santhal were arrested and by October 1967 an apparent lull was set in Naxalbari. Assessment of the Naxalbari Movement and causes for its failure: Coming to the evaluation of the Naxalbari Movement, we should keep in mind that although it was a moderate success it was suppressed within a few months. It enjoyed immense mass support, but it could not sustain for a long period of time. There are mainly two versions for the failure of the movement. One is from the point of view of Kanu Sanyal and other one is from the point of view of supporters of Charu Mazumdar. Kanu Sanyal's in his famous Report on the 'Terai Peasants’ Movement has penned down some of the reasons. The main reason according to him was excessive reliance on the spontaneity of the masses and taking them as armed forces. Among the other reasons were the inclusion of some vagabonds and making them leaders of the movement. Lack of proper plan for the redistribution of grabbed land led to conflicts among the peasants. But according to him the main defect was failure to establish a powerful mass base. Talking about military weakness of the movement, Kanu Sanyal admitted that the revolutionaries underrated the strength of the State machinery and thought that United Front Government would not go to the extent of suppressing the movement.

Land reform movement (1966–1974)
Hare Krishna Konar played a leading role in getting surplus land held by big land owners in excess of land ceiling laws and kept ‘benami’ (or false names) vested with the state. The quantum of land thus vested was around one million acres (4,000 km2) of good agricultural land. Subsequently, under the leadership of Hare Krishna Konar and Benoy Choudhury land was distributed amongst 2.4 million landless and poor farmers. It has been argued that this land reform along with Operation Barga formed the base for the Left Front victory in subsequent elections.

It was a strange quirk of history that at each stage of West Bengal's two phase land reforms there was a stalwart to guide and lead the Program. One was Hare Krishna Konar, the other Benoy Choudhury. Both of them were totally committed to the cause, profound believers in the principles of Scientific Socialism. The fearsome volatility of Konar was necessary to remove the immobility of the administration and to break the stranglehold of the landed gentry of West Bengal on the society and the political establishment in the late sixties. The amiable Gandhian mode of accommodation of Benoy Chaudhury was equally essential in another socio-political setting to carry a large majority of people with him for the success of the massive 'Operation Barga'. Each performed his unique role to carry out land reforms in two different historical situations. Soon after the first United Front (UF) government came to power in 1967, the first arrow of the now famous Naxalbari movement was shot, killing inspector Wangeli of the West Bengal police. The countryside was seething with discontent. It was a troubled time Hare Krishna Konar became the land and land revenue minister. His talks with his old compatriot Kanu Sanyal, held in a jungle about 6 km away from the Sukna forest bungalow from midnight to early morning, had failed. The new government faced a militant peasant movement. Konar was convinced that any attempt to suppress the movement by the brute force of the repressive machinery of the state would help spread the movement through underground channels. Being a practitioner of the militant peasant movement himself, he knew the fish in water tactics of armed partisan action. He was determined to evaporate the water by weaning away the landless and land-poor peasantry by substantially meeting their land hunger. And that could be done only through vesting of ceiling surplus land held clandestinely by the landed gentry of the state. Shortly after he assumed power Hare Krishna Konar had me appointed as director of land records and surveys and put in charge of unearthing land held 'Benami' in excess of the ceiling and vesting them in the state through due process of law.

Ingenious strategy of Konar and Choudhury 

Though the UF came to power with tremendous electoral support, it had to function strictly within the rigid parameters of the IndianConstitution, the established basic laws, Judicial review of executive action and set legal and administrative procedures and practises. Any threat to any of the established parameters would have led to a summary dismissal by the not so friendly central government. The political genius of Hare Krishna Konar lay in his ability to play his own ball game with the same set of rules which were apparently set against it. The Constitution of India guarantees the right to form associations and unions and to assemble peaceably. The Indian Evi-Dence Act permits disbelieving of documentary evidence on the strength of overwhelmingly reliable oral evidence. The Criminal Procedure Code (CrPC)(u/s 110) allows some sort of public participation for gathering evidence against a person allegedly engaged in "bad livelihood" in order to bind him down for good behaviour. Nowhere is it stated that the restraining powers under the CrPC should always be used against the peasantry and workers. If the agricultural workers and share-croppers assemble peacefully to espouse a cause, if public order was threatened by landowners, the latter could be restrained under the CrPC in the interest of maintenance of public order. Combine the essence of these constitutional and legal rights and procedures and you have the "Konar" recipe of legal reform with popular participation. It was so simple, so bold and so novel. Konar did not approve of the seizure and occupation by force of private property by peasants, even though such lands had in many cases been held 'benami'. Peasants, according to him, were conservative by nature. In their psyche private property was inviolable. Having lost their land through the process of exploitation, they hankered for their land as their own property. Hence illegal occupation of even illegally-held land would not absolve them of the sense of guilt for an illegal and even immoral action. Therefore, they would not have the courage and determination to fight for their rights if threatened with eviction in a changed political situation. Konar, therefore, favoured the legal way of vesting land in the state. Once the land became the property of the state, what would happen to it would be a matter of state policy and no individual's property right would be involved. It may look strange for a revolutionary, but being a hard-headed realist, it made sense to Konar.

Barga Operation was his notable contribution to the people from Left Front Government of West Bengal. To begin with, group meetings between Officials and Bargadars were organized during "settlement camps" (also called "Reorientation camps"), where the bargadars could discuss their grievances. The first such camp was held at Halusai in Polba taluk in Hooghly district from 18 to 20 May 1978. In noted camp two Adibashi Borgaders objected procedure adopted by the official for Barga Operation. They suggested to start it organising people in the field instead of sitting in the houses of rural rich people or the places dominated by them. Having that report Hare Krishna Konar immediately reorganised action plan and successful Barga Operation was done.

Our Land Problem
THE LAND QUESTION is a national question and not one affecting merely the peasantry. If we fail to solve the land problem, the whole society will go down. If the nation as a whole does not stand behind the measures for land reform, the peasantry or the Government can do very little by themselves. History tells us that the land question and the struggle of the peasantry to resolve it were the motive force behind every revolutionary uprising whether in Russia or China or Vietnam. We are not sure how the land problem is going to be solved in India and what the future of this country will be. As I had said, the question of land reform does not affect the poor peasant only. Land reform is an imperative necessity for the revitalization of a moribund economy and a backward country. Modern research puts all the emphasis on providing technical know-how to increase agricultural production. This is a one-sided approach. Agriculture does not depend on the bounties of Nature alone. The peasant must have a love for his profession and there must be conscious effort for increasing production. Concentration of land in a few lands will condemn many to forced unemployment and make them a liability of society. Even if there is full production, it will not lead to equal distribution of food unless there is an equal distribution of land. Sanction of law will fail to put an end to malpractices. If opportunities to reap higher profits with less labour and investment exist, people will naturally try to take advantage of such opportunities and it is idle to believe their attitude can be changed through sermons. Solution of the land problem is necessary not only from the point of view of social justice but also from that of increasing food production. To build up our country try we must stand on our own legs and shed dependence on foreign aid. A scientific mobilization of our natural and human resources will go a long way to develop our agriculture. It is wrong notion that small holding are a bar to increasing production. Even if the peasant is given a small plot of land, he will feel the urge for increasing production since he feels it is his own. Of course, these is a limit to such an increase. The primary task, therefore, is abolition of large scale land and its distribution to the landless, the next step would be for the government to explain to the peasants the disadvantages of cultivating small holdings. The peasant will then voluntarily take to collective farming. Private ownership of land will thus be done away with. Then comes the question of removing the pressure on land. Land distribution by itself will not solve this problem. The pressure on land has to be reduced gradually. Cottage industries have got a positive role in this respect and those to be developed. The development of cottage industries, however, will not make for full-scale economic regeneration. We have to embark on industrial development. The rich will be denied the luxurious living they enjoy now, not because we have any personal grudge against them but because that mode of living does not fit with the over all interest of the country. Without going in for a radical change of the existing social system, we can not take the country along the path of progress and prosperity. It is impossible for the government to solve the land problem under the present social system. The Zamindars and Maharajas, who have other sources of income, should not be allowed to possess land. But the constitution stands in the way of taking such step. We, however, can and should try to plug the loop holes in the law relating to celling on land. The machinery of the Government connot carry out land reforms even though there are honest officers in the administration. In our case, there is the bureaucracy – a built in obstacle. The efforts of the administration have to be strengthened and supplemented by the conscious and organized participation of the peasants and the people at large. Academic discussion, to be useful, must shed their abstract nature and be practical and down to earth enunciation of policies and programme. A combination of all these factors will enable us to solve the land problems.

Political ideology
Hare Krishna Konar claimed that he have been embraced with the Nationalism ideas from young age only for that's why he has to go to Alipore Jail at the age of 15 because he was directly connected with India's Civil Disobedience Movement. Afted depoted to Cellular Jail for joining India's Extremist Movement. Comrade Hare Krishna Konar said that Satish Pakrashi and Shiv Verma played an important role in his Marxist career because they were the men who taught him about Communism and Socialism while he was in the Cellular Jail. He was allured with the communist Ideology which led him to create the marxist Indian independence organization named the Communist Consolidation. 

He said that he got influenced with the philosophy of Karl Marx and Friedrich Engels and the influencer leader Vladimir Lenin. After the founding of Communist Party of India (Marxist) Comrade Hare Krishna Konar's aim was to start India's first Land Reform and to distribute whole country land to equally divided among poor and rich people without discriminating and his thought was to make the peasant and farmers the head of the state rather than the capitalist people and he was also totally opposed of private land ownership for that's why while he was the first Land Minister of India in West Bengal he made a law of limited private Land ownership the limitation was 70–90 bigha per family and this law was started from early 1968s and till Left Front led in West Bengal up to 2011. He has also said that firstly he was believer in Maoist ideology but after knowing the thoughts of Mao Zedong he started believing the Marxist–Leninist idology. But people believe that Comrade Hare Krishna Konar was the first believer of "Scientific Socialism" in India and he is also the Father of India's Land Reform because the main puzzled matter of Land Reform was to seizure land from big landlords of West bengal and that was done under the leadership of Hare Krishna Konar, he always say that to occupy the land from landlords there is only one process and that is Brain Washing because rather than brain wash if we occupy the land forcefully then there will be a bad impression on communist that is fascist so konar done land reform with the help of brain washing and thus the main political view of Comrade Hare Krishna Konar was Marxist and Communist.

Achievements
He won the elections to the state assembly from Kalna (Vidhan Sabha constituency) in 1957–1971.

He was Minister for Land and Land Revenue in the United Front ministries in 1967–1970.

He was the General Secretary of the All India Kisan Sabha from 1968 to 1974.

He was the Member of founding Central Committee of the Communist Party of India (Marxist) from 1964 to 1974.

He was the Member of National Council of Communist Party of India from 1958 up to his resign (suspended) in 1964.

He was the Member of West Bengal Legislative Assembly from Kalna in 1957–1972.

He is one of the co-founders of Communist Party of India (Marxist).

He was the Founder of Communist Consolidation.

He was the main leader to successfully passed the bill and done the first Land Reform in India.

He was the Member of West Bengal State Committee of Communist Party of India (Marxist) from its founding to until his death in 1974.

Death and legacy

Death
Hare Krishna Konar died of cancer at the age of 58 on 23 July 1974 in Kolkata. He was given a state funeral by the West Bengal state government. His funeral rally was the 4th largest funeral rally in India. It was attended by millions of people who had come from every part of India and national leaders such as Indira Gandhi, Harkishan Singh Surjeet, B. T. Ranadive,  A. K. Gopalan, E. M. S. Namboodiripad, as well as an international delegation including representatives from North Korea, Vietnam, China and Soviet Union.

Legacy
The headquarters of Communist Party of India (Marxist)'s All India Kisan Sabha in West Bengal is named after him. A street in Kolkata, a road in Durgapur in West Bengal, and a bridge in Memari in West Bengal are named in his honor. A government sponsored rural library made in Hare Krishna Konar's birthplace in Kamargaria village in West Bengal is also named after him.

Album
Some old pictures of Hare Krishna Konar

Electoral history
Hare Krishna Konar was the Minister of Land and Land Revenue consecutively 4 times and every time he was the Member of Legislative Assembly from Kalna (Vidhan Sabha constituency) seat 5 times.

Published Books
 Pathera sandhāna(Published in 1976 by National Book Agency of India).
 Agrarian Problems of India(Published in 1977 by National Book Agency of India).
 Bhāratera kṛshi samasyā(Published in 1980 by National Book Agency of India and it is the Bengali version of Agrarian Problems of India is translated by Hare Krishna Konar).
 Selected Works(Published in 1977 by National Book Agency of India and it is a selected articles, letters and political background of Hare Krishna Konar).
 Hare Krishna Konar prabandha sangraha(Published in 2015  by National Book Agency of India and it is a biography book of Comrade Hare Krishna Konar).

See also
• Sino-Soviet split

• Left Front (West Bengal)

• List of University of Calcutta people

References

External links

The library named after Hare Krishna Konar
Comparing two icon Piero Sraffa and Hare Krishna Konar
Hare Krishna Konar v. DwijendraLal Sengupta

1915 births
1974 deaths
People from Purba Bardhaman district
Bangabasi College alumni
University of Calcutta alumni
Revolutionaries of Bengal during British Rule
Revolutionary movement for Indian independence
Prisoners and detainees of British India
Indian independence armed struggle activists
Indian independence activists from Bengal
West Bengal politicians
20th-century atheists
Anushilan Samiti
Indian nationalists
Indian revolutionaries
Indian Marxists
Indian communists
Bengali communists
Indian former Hindus
Indian atheism activists
Hunger strikers
Anti-imperialism
Anti-imperialism in Asia
Indian anti-capitalists
Anti-fascists
Minister of Land Administration and Land Reforms
Communist Party of India (Marxist) politicians from West Bengal
China–India relations
India–Vietnam relations
India–Soviet Union relations
Trade unionists from West Bengal
West Bengal MLAs 1957–1962
West Bengal MLAs 1962–1967
West Bengal MLAs 1967–1969
West Bengal MLAs 1969–1971
West Bengal MLAs 1971–1972
Indian writers
Indian male writers
Indian political writers
Writers from West Bengal
Indian economics writers
20th-century Indian non-fiction writers
20th-century Indian social scientists
Bengali-language writers
English-language writers from India
Deaths from cancer
Deaths from cancer in India